= Ian Vaughan =

English footballer

Personal information
- Date of birth: 3 July 1961 (age 65)
- Place of birth: Sheffield, England
- Position: Defender

Youth career
- Rotherham United

Senior career*
| Years | Team | Apps | (Gls) |
| | Rotherham United | 35 | (0) |
| | Stockport County (loan) | 6 | (1) |
| | Burton Albion | 185 | (7) |
| | Mossley | 45 | |
- Todwick Town
- * Club domestic league appearances and goals

Ian Vaughan (born 3 July 1961) is an English former professional football defender. He played in the Football League for Rotherham United and Stockport County.

Vaughan was an apprentice with Rotherham United, later turning professional with Rotherham and making his league debut in the 1979–80 season. He played 25 times in the league for Rotherham, scoring a blinding right footed volley in the memorable FA Cup first-round game vs York City during the 1980/1 season.

Vaughan's career highlights at Rotherham included a celebration of Rotherham's promotion to the Second Division at the close of the 1980–81 season, making 10 appearances, the same year, Vaughan captained the Rotherham side in a 2–1 win over rivals Sheffield Wednesday in the final of the Sheffield & Hallamshire County Cup.

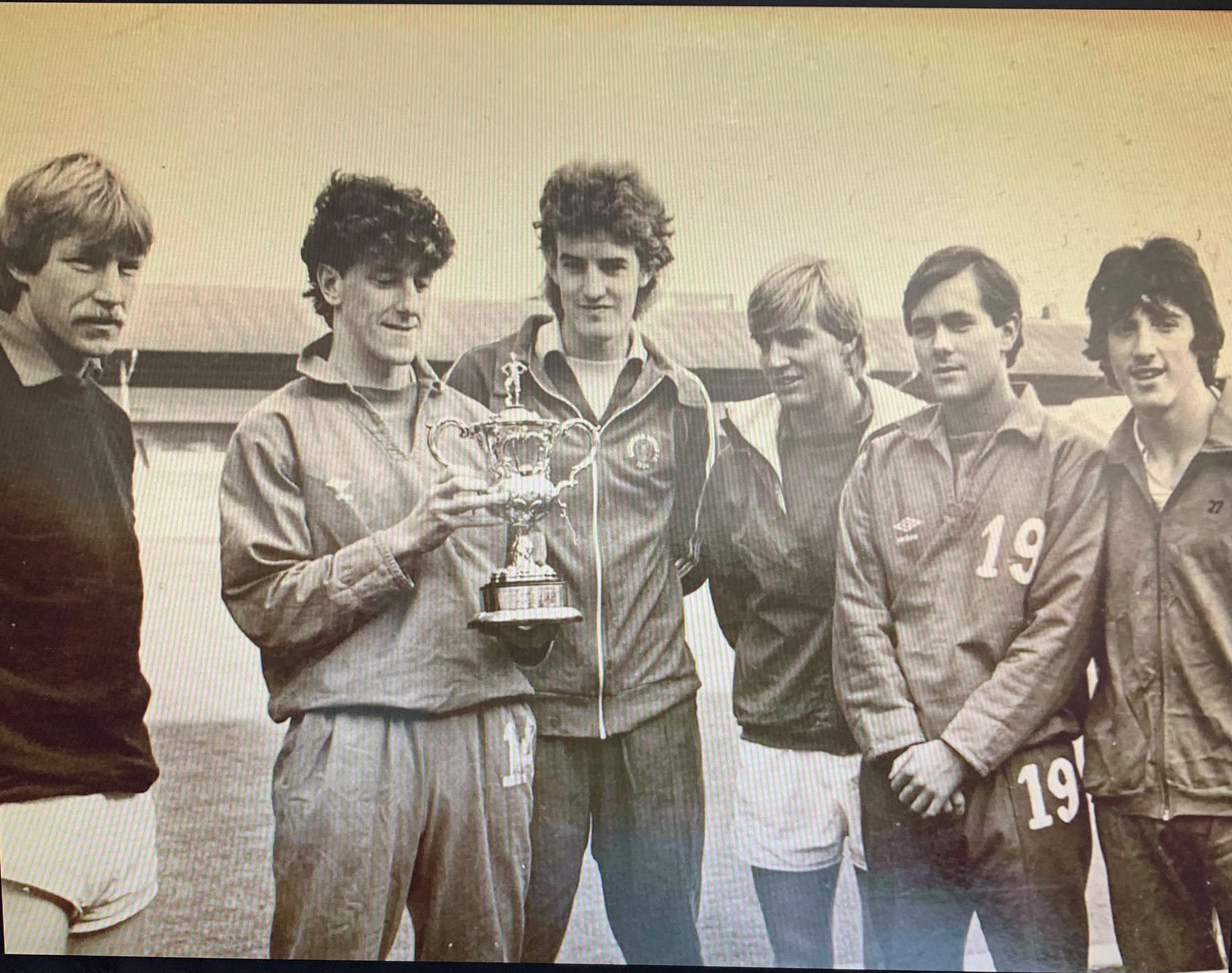

He also made 10 appearances while on loan to Stockport County, before leaving to join then non-league Burton Albion. He subsequently joined Mossley, playing 85 times in the 1986–87 season before leaving to finish his career with Buxton FC .
